Yelena Valerievna Zgardan ((Авдекова); born 7 January 1989) was a Russian handball player for Kisvárdai KC and the Russian national team.

Individual awards
 Team of the Tournament Left Wing of the Bucharest Trophy: 2015

References

1989 births
Living people
Russian female handball players
Expatriate handball players
Russian expatriate sportspeople in Romania
Russian expatriates in Hungary
People from Novokuznetsk
Sportspeople from Kemerovo Oblast